Discomind is a band that is a fusion of disco, house, and rock featuring vocals by Sheila Horne of George Clinton's P-Funk All-Stars.  The band also includes Kraze, Shane, Lanny Ward, and Danny Jam.

Kraze (Richard Jean Laurent) had earlier had an international hit with the 1988 house music single, "The Party".

References

American rock music groups
Motéma Music artists